Odirile Ishmael Sento, popularly known as Vee or Vee Mampeezy , is a Motswana singer, songwriter and the CEO of Lamalanga and Black Money Makers records.

Early life 
Mampeezy was born in 1983 in Hukuntsi.

Career 
His first album was released under the Black Money Makers studio, and later moved to Eric Ramco records.

Personal life 
He is married to Kagiso Ruth Ludo Sento and has two children.The couple divorced in November 2022.

Discography

Singles 

 Taku Taku (2004)
 Stimela (2008)
 Zaza (2010)
 Vee (2011-2012)
 Crossroads (2012)
 I Do (2016)
 Champion (2017)
 Dumalana (2019)
 Dololo (2019)
  Moya (2022)

Albums 

 Introloction (2001)
Lamalanga (2003)
 Kasi Angels (2004)
 Ntja Mme (2005)
 Ditshipi Tsame (2006)
 Kasiology (2007)
 Stimela (2008)
 Everybady (2009)
 Supernatural Vol1 (2013)
 Supernatural Vol2 (2014)
 Supernatural Vol3 (2015)

Awards and nominations 

 Metro FM award 2017
 One Africa award, album - I Do

See also 

 Sasa Klaas
 Khuli Chana
 Charma Gal
Ross Branch

References

External links 

 

1983 births
Living people
Botswana musical groups
Botswana male singers